Histiophryne maggiewalker, known as the Queensland frogfish, is a species of fish in the family Antennariidae. It is known only from Australia, where it occurs in shallow inshore waters at a depth range of 7 to 12 m (23 to 39 ft). Males of the species reach 5.5 cm (2.2 inches) SL (standard length), whereas females are slightly larger at up to 6 cm (2.3 inches) SL. The species was described in 2011 by Rachel Arnold and Theodore Pietsch from six specimens collected in shallow waters off Queensland, and it is named for Maggie Walker, for her service and dedication to science and education at the University of Washington and the Burke Museum of Natural History and Culture.

References 

Antennariidae
Fish of Australia
Fish described in 2011
Taxa named by Theodore Wells Pietsch III